The Changchun Film Festival (中国长春电影节) is a biennial international film festival held in the Chinese city of Changchun. Ostensibly international, its award for best film, the Golden Deer has nevertheless primarily been awarded to Chinese and other East Asia-region films. It was first held in 1992 and was founded in part by the Changchun Film Studio (now the Changchun Film Studio Group Corporation). 

The festival is funded in part by the Ministry of Radio, Cinema, and Television, the provincial government of Jilin, and the Changchun municipal government.

Golden Deer Award (Best  Film)

Best Director

Best Screenplay

Best Actress

Best Actor

Best Supporting Actress

Best Supporting Actor

See also 
 List of film festivals in China

External links
Changchun Film Festival at the Internet Movie Database

Film festivals established in 1992
Film festivals in China
1992 establishments in China
Biennial events
Autumn events in China